Warkworth is a village and civil parish in West Northamptonshire, about  east of Banbury in Oxfordshire and  southeast of junction 11 of the M40 motorway.

The land on which the village lies was granted to the Lyons family by William the Conqueror, shortly after the Norman Conquest, and belonged to the family
until the 15th century. Their seat was Warkworth Castle.

The 2001 Census recorded the parish's population as 31.

History
The village's name means 'We(o)rca's enclosure' or 'We(o)rce's enclosure', a female individual name. Bede makes reference to an abbess called Verce in Tynemouth in the seventh century. On the other hand, the individual name may be 'Waeferce'.

The Norman Lyons family were granted the lands of Warkworth by William the Conqueror, in 1080, and built Warkworth Castle for their seat. The Lyons family owned the Castle and the estates until the 15th century. Several members of the Lyons family are buried at the Church of St Mary at Warkworth, including two in spectacular effigies (see below).

The Castle had semicircular towers and a large gatehouse. In 1629 it passed to the Holman family, who had it converted into a Jacobean mansion. It was demolished in 1805.

An open field system of farming prevailed in Warkworth until the 18th century. Its land tenure was linked with that of Overthorpe and Nethercote, Banbury, which at that time was part of Middleton Cheney parish. Parliament passed a single Inclosure Act for both Overthorpe and Warkworth in 1764. Today only Nethercote, Banbury has  ridge and furrow land form remaining from these times

Church of St Mary
The Church of St Mary is 14th-century Decorated Gothic. The Church was partly rebuilt in 1840–41 and 1869, and on the latter occasion under the direction of Charles Driver. The three-bay north arcade, the arch and east window of the south transept, and the windows in the south aisle are 14th-century. The south arcade, north aisle windows, chancel and top of the west tower are 19th-century Gothic Revival. The south aisle has a squint to the chancel. The Church is Grade II* listed.

Monuments to Lyons and Chetwode families
Inside the church are several monuments. Several members of the Lyons family are buried in the Church: in the North Aisle there is a tomb-chest with an effigy of enclosed Sir John de Lyons (1289 - 1348), who was Lord of Warkworth in 1322, and an effigy of Sir John de Lyons (1320 – 1385). The daughter, Elizabeth, of Sir John Lyons, (d.1385) who was Lord of Warkworth, married Sir John Chetwode. Despite the fact that she had cousins, the Lyons estate passed to Sir John Chetwode when Elizabeth Lyons died without male siblings, and Chetwode adopted the older and more distinguished Lyons arms, in preference to his own arms, and the title 'Lord of Warkworth'.

Therefore, the Chetwode family are buried and commemorated in the Church. There are five 15th-century monumental brasses: to Sir John Chetwode (died 1412), a second John Chetwode (died 1420), Margaret Brounyng (died 1420), Lady Chetwode (died 1430) and William Ludsthorp (died 1454). There is also an 18th-century monument to William Holman (died 1740).

St Mary's parish is a member of the Chenderit Benefice, which includes the parishes of Chacombe, Greatworth, Marston St. Lawrence, Middleton Cheney and Thenford.

Amenities
The Jurassic Way long distance footpath passes through Warkworth village.

See also
Grimsbury
Nethercote, Banbury

References

Sources

External links

Civil parishes in Northamptonshire
Villages in Northamptonshire
West Northamptonshire District